A Metropolitan Opera Gala or simply a Met Gala is a formal event hosted by the Metropolitan Opera. The Met frequently stages "Gala" events in which it celebrates the talents of its top performers.

See also
 The Metropolitan Opera Centennial Gala (1983)
 The Metropolitan Opera Gala 1991
 James Levine's 25th Anniversary Metropolitan Opera Gala (1996)

Notes

Culture of New York City
Events in New York City
Metropolitan Opera